The AEC 662T was a two-axle single deck trolleybus chassis manufactured by AEC between 1931 and 1935. A single deck version of the AEC 661T, 21 were built for English operators in Darlington (11) and Nottinghamshire and Derbyshire (10).

References

662
Trolleybuses
Vehicles introduced in 1931